Matta is an underground metro station of Line 3 of the Santiago Metro network, in Santiago, Chile. It is an underground, between the Parque Almagro and Irarrázaval stations on Line 3. It is located at the intersection of Matta Avenue with Santa Rosa Avenue. The station was opened on 22 January 2019 as part of the inaugural section of the line, from Los Libertadores to Fernando Castillo Velasco.

It is expected that by 2030 this station will be combined with the future Line 9.

Etymology
The station is called "Matta", since it is located on Avenida Matta. The street remembers Manuel Antonio Matta, who was a politician and lawyer who in 1863 founded the Partido Radical de Chile.

References

External links 
Metro de Santiago website (in Spanish)

Santiago Metro stations
Railway stations opened in 2019